"Heart Heart Heartbreak" is a song written by Boys Like Girls' lead singer Martin Johnson, along with Sam Hollander and Dave Katz of the production team S*A*M and Sluggo. The song is the third single released from Boys Like Girls' second studio album, Love Drunk and was released on April 13, 2010.

Reception
The song was released to radio on April 13, 2010, debuting at number 36 on the U.S. Billboard Mainstream Top 40 (Pop Songs) chart the following week. After seven weeks on the chart, it peaked at number 31 in June 2010, the group's first single to miss the top 30 on that chart. Fearne Cotton chose this song as her Record of the Week on October 25, 2010.

Music video
A music video was also made and released, which premiered on Vevo on June 4, 2010. The video was directed by Doug Spangenberg, who had previously directed their video for "Heels Over Head" which was a live video from their Read Between the Lines album. The music video takes place at a beauty pageant ("Brockton Beauties") where the girls are sabotaging each other to win.

Chart performance

References

2010 singles
Boys Like Girls songs
Songs written by Sam Hollander
Songs written by Dave Katz
Songs written by Martin Johnson (musician)
2009 songs
Columbia Records singles